The Vice Premier of the Republic of China serves as the deputy to the premier and is appointed by the president, on the recommendation of the Premier. The title of vice premier had been changed several times, so this list is divided into several sections. This includes both vice premiers of the Republic of China before 1949, when the seat of government was in Mainland China, and vice premiers since 1949, when the seat of government was relocated to Taiwan.

List

Vice presidents of Executive Yuan of the National Government (1928–1948)

Vice presidents of Executive Yuan of the Republic of China (1948–present)

See also 

 List of premiers of the Republic of China
 List of presidents of the Republic of China
 List of vice presidents of the Republic of China

References

Vice premiers
Lists of Taiwanese politicians

Political office-holders in the Republic of China on Taiwan
Political office-holders in the Republic of China
Vice premier